Haymarket District is a historic section of downtown Lincoln, Nebraska.

Overview 
The area is a tourist attraction and home to the Haymarket Park baseball stadium. Its historic significance has been recognized by being listed on the National Register of Historic Places as the Lincoln Haymarket Historic District.

The name Haymarket originated from the 1867 market square where hay, and travel items, were marketed. The warehouses have been readapted as retail shops.

 

The district held a Halloween event in 2018.

Buildings in the district were designed by various firms including Fiske & Meginnis and Meginnis and Schaumberg.
The historic J. C. Ridnour Building (1925)  designed by Meginnis and Schaumberg is in the district.

Gallery

See also
 Neighborhoods in Lincoln, Nebraska

References

External links
Historic Haymarket website

1867 establishments in Nebraska
Geography of Lincoln, Nebraska
Historic districts on the National Register of Historic Places in Nebraska
History of Lincoln, Nebraska
National Register of Historic Places in Lancaster County, Nebraska
Unincorporated communities in Lancaster County, Nebraska
Unincorporated communities in Nebraska